Trouble on the Corner is a 1997 crime drama film in which Tony Goldwyn plays Jeff Steward, a psychologist, takes good care of his patients mostly living in the same apartment. One day a piece of the bathroom ceiling collapses so he can watch the woman living in the upper apartment taking a bath. This causes total disorder of his normal life and he starts mixing the patients' psychoses up with his own.

Cast
 Tony Goldwyn - Jeff Steward
 Edie Falco - Vivian Steward
 Debi Mazar - Ericca Ricce
 Joe Morton - Detective Bill
 Tammy Grimes - Mrs. K.
 Giancarlo Esposito - Daryl
 Roger Rees - McMurtry
 Bruce MacVittie - Sandy
 Mark Margolis - Mr. Borofsky
 Charles Busch - Ms. Ellen

Production crew
Directed by Alan Madison

External links
 
 

1997 films
1997 crime drama films
American crime drama films
1990s English-language films
1990s American films

de:Showdown am Adlerpaß